Divine Access is a 2015 American comedy-drama film directed by Steven Chester Prince and starring Billy Burke, Gary Cole, Patrick Warburton, Adrienne Barbeau and Dora Madison Burge.  It is Prince's directorial debut and Burke served as a producer of the film.

Cast
Billy Burke as Jack Harriman
Patrick Warburton as Bob
Gary Cole as Reverend Guy Roy Davis
Sarah Shahi as Marian
Dora Madison Burge as Amber
Joel David Moore as Nigel
 Barak Hardley as Pyramid Pete
Adrienne Barbeau as Catherine
 Austin Lyon as Caller
Katherine Willis as Amber's Mom
 Michael Zagst as Lonnie

Reception
The film has a 67% rating on Rotten Tomatoes.  Jake Nevins of Paste gave it a rating of 6.5. On Vudu the reviewers have given it a 3.5 star rating.

References

External links
 
 
 
 

American comedy-drama films
2015 directorial debut films
2015 films
2015 comedy-drama films
2010s English-language films
2010s American films